Grande Cache Institution is a medium security prison located in Grande Cache, Alberta.

History 
The facility was opened in 1985 and operated by the province of Alberta (Correctional Services of the Ministry of Solicitor General and Public Security) as the Grande Cache Correctional Centre until 1995. At that time, Correctional Service of Canada took possession of the property under a long-term lease from the province. 

While operated by the province of Alberta, the facility housed a Special Housing Unit. 

As a federal institution, it was previously operated as a minimum security prison. However, it was converted to medium security in 2009/2010.

References 

Prisons in Alberta
Municipal District of Greenview No. 16
Correctional Service of Canada institutions
1985 establishments in Alberta